IFK Malmö football team is a section of Swedish sports club IFK Malmö based in Malmö. The club is affiliated with Skånes Fotbollförbund and play their home games at Malmö Stadion. The club colours, reflected in their crest and kit, are yellow, blue and white. But the original crest is only yellow (see below). Formed on 23 April 1899, the club have played thirteen seasons in Sweden's highest league Allsvenskan where they best finished as runners-up in 1960 and played their most recent season in 1962. IFK Malmö also reached the quarter-finals of the European Champions Cup in the 1960–61 season. The club is currently playing in Division 1 Södra, the 3rd tier of Swedish football.

History 
The club was founded in 1899, making it the oldest football club in the city of Malmö. They participated in the first season of Allsvenskan in 1924/25. The club has altogether played 13 seasons in the premier division, in 1960 IFK finished second. In 1961, they made it to the quarter-finals of the European Cup (losing to Rapid Vienna). Before the 2009 season, the club switched their home stadium from Malmö IP to Malmö Stadion.

Historically, the club's main rivals are Malmö FF, although this rivalry has been toned down since the two clubs have not played in the same division for nearly 60 years. The club is affiliated with the Skånes Fotbollförbund.

Kits 
IFK Malmö is often colloquially called di gule (the yellow) in reference to their team colours. At the 1958 World Cup held in Sweden, the Argentina national football team wore IFK's home shirt because their rivals West Germany would not agree to use their alternative colours.

Season to season

Attendances 

In recent seasons IFK Malmö have had the following average attendances:

Technical staff

Achievements 
 Allsvenskan: runners-up 1960
 Division 2 Södra Götaland: 2006
Division 2 Västra Götaland: 2020

Footnotes

External links 
  

 
Fotboll
Allsvenskan clubs
Sport in Malmö
Football clubs in Skåne County
Football clubs in Malmö
Association football clubs established in 1899
1899 establishments in Sweden
19th-century establishments in Skåne County